The John and Ann Rhoads Softball Stadium (frequently shortened to Rhoads Stadium) is a college softball stadium located on the campus of the University of Alabama in Tuscaloosa, Alabama.  It serves as the home field of the Alabama Crimson Tide softball team and is located on the corner of Peter Bryce Boulevard and Campus Drive on the northeast corner of campus.  The Crimson Tide's all-time record at Rhoads Stadium is 316–50. It is the largest softball stadium affiliated with an individual university with an official capacity of 3,940. After they played their first season at Sokol Park and at Bowers Park for both the 1998 and 1999 seasons, the Crimson Tide opened Rhoads Stadium on February 23, 2000, with a 7–1 victory over the UAB Blazers.

John L. Rhoads was a graduate of the University of Alabama and a long-time partner at accounting firm Ernst & Ernst. He died in 2001.

Events hosted
While the general use of the Rhoads Stadium is the regular season home of the Crimson Tide, it has also played host to a number of different events including multiple post season NCAA and SEC tournaments, as well as marquee exhibition games.

Post season tournaments

Attendance
As the program has continued to grow, attendance at Rhoads Stadium has continued to increase. In 2010, the Crimson Tide established a new single season, NCAA attendance record with 63,271 fans in attendance over the course of their 28 home dates. Their record was subsequently broken by Arizona in 2011 when the Wildcats saw 72,545 fans in attendance over the course of their 28 home dates. Prior to the 2012 season, Rhoads Stadium saw its capacity increase to 3,940, and Alabama reached that capacity for the first time on April 14, 2012, in a 7–5 win against South Carolina to set a new school, single-game attendance record. These attendance records are more easily reached given the only softball stadium with more capacity in the United States is the ASA Hall of Fame Stadium (the home stadium of the NCAA Softball World Series).

External links
Rhoads Stadium at RollTide.com

References

Alabama Crimson Tide softball
College softball venues in the United States
Sports venues in Tuscaloosa, Alabama
2000 establishments in Alabama
Sports venues completed in 2000